Ekaterina Valeryevna Gnidenko (born 11 December 1992 in Tula) is a Russian track cyclist. At the 2012 Summer Olympics, she competed in the Women's sprint but was subsequently found to have been using turinabol a banned product and was disqualified.

Gnidenko later appealed her disqualification to the Court of Arbitration for Sport (CAS), seeking to have her disqualification from the 2012 Olympics overturned. On 26 July 2018, the CAS dismissed  Gnidenko's appeal, upholding her disqualification.

Career results

2011
UEC European U23 Track Championships
2nd Team Sprint (with Elena Brejniva)
3rd Sprint
2013
Grand Prix of Russian Helicopters
1st Team Sprint (with Olga Streltsova)
2nd Keirin
2nd Team Sprint, UEC European U23 Track Championships (with Anastasia Voynova)
2014
Grand Prix of Tula
1st Sprint
1st Team Sprint (with Anastasia Voynova)
2nd Keirin
3rd 500m Time Trial
1st Keirin, Grand Prix of Russian Helicopters
2015
Grand Prix Minsk
1st Keirin
3rd 500m Time Trial
Grand Prix of Tula
2nd Sprint
2nd Team Sprint (with Tatiana Kiseleva)
2nd Keirin, Cottbuser SprintCup
3rd Keirin, UEC European Track Championships
2016
Grand Prix Minsk
1st Keirin
3rd 500m Time Trial
Memorial of Alexander Lesnikov
2nd Team Sprint (with Tatiana Kiseleva)
3rd Keirin
3rd Sprint
Grand Prix of Tula
2nd Sprint
2nd Team Sprint (with Tatiana Kiseleva)

References

Russian female cyclists
1992 births
Living people
Olympic cyclists of Russia
Cyclists at the 2012 Summer Olympics
Russian track cyclists
Sportspeople from Tula, Russia
Russian sportspeople in doping cases
Doping cases in cycling
European Games competitors for Russia
Cyclists at the 2019 European Games